WHIL (91.3 FM) is an NPR-affiliated radio station in Mobile, Alabama. It primarily features classical music and news and talk programming. WHIL's signal travels in about a 45-mile radius from Mobile—serving the extreme southern tip of Alabama along the state's portion of the Gulf Coast (and some counties to the north, in southwestern Alabama), as well as the Gulf Coast counties of southeastern Mississippi and extreme northwestern Florida.

Until 2011, the station maintained studios on the campus of Spring Hill College, a Jesuit institution that started the station and held the broadcast license.

On July 1, 2011, WHIL-FM discontinued operations as a stand-alone station, having been acquired by the University of Alabama to serve as a local affiliate for its Alabama Public Radio network.

History
WHIL first broadcast as WHIL-FM on September 5, 1979.  Only a week later, Hurricane Frederic struck the Alabama Gulf Coast, rendering the station silent for some time thereafter due to transmitter and tower damage. From those rough beginnings, the station grew to provide one of the few non-commercial radio services available to the region with programming not designed for religious proselytization. In later years, it used the branding "Fine Arts Radio for the Gulf Coast," a summary of its mission and scope.

Of the public radio stations and networks located in Alabama, WHIL-FM was the only one not operated by an agency or educational institution of the state. It was the fourth chronologically, after Huntsville's WLRH, Birmingham's WBHM, and Troy's WTSU; only Tuscaloosa (Alabama Public Radio) came later, in 1982.

On March 21, 2011, Spring Hill College and University of Alabama officials announced the sale of WHIL-FM to UA, which converted WHIL-FM into a translator of APR on July 1, 2011. This move reflected increasing consolidation in non-commercial radio, a situation largely occurring because of the economic downturn that took place in the late 2000s.

On June 14, 2016, the station changed its call sign from WHIL-FM to the current WHIL.

Programming
In the mid-to-late 1990s, Spring Hill College officials took exception to some news reports on National Public Radio about subjects such as abortion rights and homosexuality. Because these seemed to denigrate the moral positions of the Roman Catholic order of the Society of Jesus, the parent organization of the college, WHIL-FM discontinued airing NPR news programs for several years. Protests from disappointed and angry listeners prompted WHIL-FM to restore Morning Edition, but the station continued to preempt All Things Considered in favor of classical music and Public Radio International's Marketplace. However, in response to a survey of local public radio listeners, WHIL-FM returned ATC to its schedule in early 2007.

References

External links
 WHIL official website
 
 "Radio Avalon" site

HIL (FM)
NPR member stations
Classical music radio stations in the United States
Radio stations established in 1979
1979 establishments in Alabama